Karen Dieffenthaler (born 15 November 1967) is a swimmer from Trinidad and Tobago. She competed in three events at the 1988 Summer Olympics.

References

External links
 

1967 births
Living people
Trinidad and Tobago female swimmers
Olympic swimmers of Trinidad and Tobago
Swimmers at the 1988 Summer Olympics
Swimmers at the 1987 Pan American Games
Pan American Games competitors for Trinidad and Tobago
Place of birth missing (living people)